Bruno Octávio Jovanelli or simply Bruno Octávio (born 2 August 1985 ) is a Brazilian defensive midfielder.

Career 
On 20 February 2009 the Corinthians midfielder.

Honours
Campeonato Brasileiro: 2005,2011
Campeonato Brasileiro serie B :2008
Campeonato Paulista :2009

Contract
25 July 2005 to 31 December 2007

External links
 CBF
 zerozero.pt
 sambafoot
 placar
 globoesporte
 lustosa

1985 births
Living people
People from São Caetano do Sul
Brazilian footballers
Association football midfielders
Sport Club Corinthians Paulista players
Figueirense FC players
Paulista Futebol Clube players
Footballers from São Paulo (state)